Abswurmbachite is a copper manganese silicate mineral ((Cu,Mn2+)Mn3+6O8SiO4). It was first described in 1991 and named after Irmgard Abs-Wurmbach (born 1938), a German mineralogist.  It crystallizes in the tetragonal system. Its Mohs scale rating is 6.5 and a specific gravity of 4.96.  It has a metallic luster and its color is jet black, with light brown streaks.

See also
List of minerals
List of minerals named after people

References

Mindat.org - Abswurmbachite
Webmineral.com - Abswurmbachite
Handbook of Mineralogy - Abswurmbachite

Nesosilicates
Tetragonal minerals
Minerals in space group 142